The genus Geomys contains 12 species of pocket gophers often collectively referred to as the eastern pocket gophers.  Like all pocket gophers, members of this genus are fossorial herbivores.

Species
Geomys
 Desert pocket gopher (Geomys arenarius)
 Attwater's pocket gopher (G. attwateri)
 Baird's pocket gopher (G. breviceps)
 Plains pocket gopher (G. bursarius)
 Geomys jugossicularis
 Knox Jones's pocket gopher (G. knoxjonesi)
 Geomys lutescens
 Texas pocket gopher (G. personatus)
 Southeastern pocket gopher (G. pinetis)
 Geomys streckeri
 Central Texas pocket gopher (G. texensis)
 Tropical pocket gopher (G. tropicalis)

References

 
Pocket gophers
Rodent genera
Taxa named by Constantine Samuel Rafinesque